Aulotrachichthys is a genus of slimeheads. Most species in this genus are known as luminous roughies.

Species
The currently recognized species in this genus are:
 Aulotrachichthys argyrophanus (Woods, 1961) (Western luminous roughy)
 Aulotrachichthys atlanticus (Menezes, 1971) (Brazilian luminous roughy)
 Aulotrachichthys heptalepis (Gon, 1984) (Hawaiian luminous roughy)
 Aulotrachichthys latus (Fowler, 1938) (Philippine luminous roughy)
 Aulotrachichthys novaezelandicus (Kotlyar, 1980) (New Zealand roughy)
 Aulotrachichthys prosthemius (D. S. Jordan & Fowler, 1902) (West Pacific luminous roughy)
 Aulotrachichthys pulsator M. F. Gomon & Kuiter, 1987 (golden roughy)
 Aulotrachichthys sajademalensis (Kotlyar, 1979) (Saya de Malha luminous roughy)

References

 
Marine fish genera
Taxa named by Henry Weed Fowler